David Jameson (January 1, 1723July 10, 1793) was the acting Governor of Virginia for a short period of time in 1781.

Early life
Jameson was born at St. Anne’s Parish in Essex County on January 1, 1723. He attended the College of New Jersey (now Princeton University).

Career
He was a prominent merchant in Yorktown and an inventor.  From in 1776 to 1777, he served in the Virginia State Senate during the Revolutionary War, serving on Patrick Henry's Privy Council.

He served from 1780 to 1781 as lieutenant governor under Thomas Nelson, Jr. (signor of the United States Declaration of Independence) and served as Governor briefly in August 1781 when Nelson took ill, before the ascension of Benjamin Harrison V to the office.

In 1783, he was again elected to the Virginia State Senate.

Personal life
Jameson wed Mildred Smith, the marriage produced no children.

Jameson died on July 10, 1793.

References

External links
 Biography at the National Governors Association

1723 births
1793 deaths
People from Essex County, Virginia
Virginia colonial people
American people of Scottish descent
Governors of Virginia
Lieutenant Governors of Virginia
Virginia state senators
18th-century American politicians